Balmont may refer to:

Balmont, former French commune since absorbed into Seynod 
Balmont, populated place in the French commune of Reyrieux 
Boris Balmont (1927–2022), Russian politician
Florent Balmont (born 1980), French footballer
Konstantin Balmont (1867–1942), Russian poet
Balmont (horse), Thoroughbred racehorse

See also
Belmont (disambiguation)